Glade (previously known as Whitman's Station) is an unincorporated community in Scioto Township, Jackson County, Ohio, United States.

The Glade Post Office was established on April 21, 1880, but was discontinued on October 31, 1924.  Mail service is now handled through the Beaver branch.

References 

Unincorporated communities in Jackson County, Ohio